Australoschendyla albanyensis is a species of centipede in the Schendylidae family. It is endemic to Australia, and was first described in 1996 by R. E. Jones.

Description
This species can reach 15 mm in length. Males of this species have 45 pairs of legs; females have 47 leg pairs.

Distribution
The species occurs in coastal south-western Western Australia. The type locality is Bald Head, Albany.

Behaviour
The centipedes are solitary terrestrial predators that inhabit plant litter and soil.

References

 

 
albanyensis
Centipedes of Australia
Endemic fauna of Australia
Fauna of Western Australia
Animals described in 1996